Sidabrinė gervė 2010 was the 3rd film award ceremony established by Lithuanian Cinema Academy. The ceremnony show was held in capital city of Vilnius on 28 May 2010.

Commission 
In commission which selected winners was 7 members.
Gražina Arlickaitė, humanitarian sciences doctor, European Cinema Academy member
Arūnas Matelis – directors, European Cinema Academy member, winner of Lithuanian National Prize
Živilė Pipinytė – cinema critic 
Rasa Paukštytė – cinema critic 
Viktoras Radzevičius – operator, international film festivals wiiner *
Ignas Miškinis–cinema and TV directors, „Sidabrinės gervė“ past winner
Gintaras Sodeika – compositor, „Auksinis kryžius“ winner.

Winners and nominees 
At the 2010 ceremony 41 films were nominated

Best film 
Zero II (by Emilis Vėlyvis)
Atsisveikinimas (by Tomas Donela)
Eurazijos aborigenas (by Šarūnas Bartas)

Best short film 
Lernavan (by Marat Sargsyan)
Jau puiku, tik dar šiek tiek... (by Lina Lužytė)
Aš tave žinau (by Dovilė Šarutytė)

Best documentary film 
Šarūnas Bartas - vienas lauke karys (by Guillaume Coudray)
Upė (by Julija Gruodienė, Rimantas Gruodis)
Tikras garsas Valstybės atgimimo 1989-1993 (by Domantas Vildžiūnas)

Best TV film 
Naisių vasara (by Saulius Balandis)
Svetimi (by Sigitas Račkys)
Amžini jausmai (by Alvydas Šlepikas)

Best animated film 
Luce (by Rasa Joni)
Tiulis (by Darius Jaruševičius, Ina Šilina)
Lietuvių vardas (by Nijolė Valadkevičiūtė)

Best director 
Šarūnas Bartas
Emilis Vėlyvis
Julija Gruodienė and Rimantas Gruodis

Best male actor 
Ramūnas Rudokas and Kęstutis Jakštas ("Zero II")
Dainius Kazlauskas ("Atsisveikinimas")
Juozas Budraitis ("Tėve mūsų")

Best female actor 
Klavdija Koršunova ("Eurazijos aborigenas")
Julija Steponaitytė ("Aš tave žinau")
Gabija Ryškuvienė ("Jau puiku, tik dar šiek tiek...")

Best supporting actor male 
Albinas Keleris ("Atsisveikinimas")
Marius Repšys ("Bergenas")
Petras Lisauskas ("Stiklainis uogienės")

Best supporting actor female 
Rimantė Valiukaitė ('Jau puiku, tik dar šiek tiek...")
Dalia Storyk ("Atsisveikinimas")
Inga Jankauskaitė ("Zero II")

Best scenario 
Dovilė Šarutytė ("Aš tave žinau")
Lina Lužytė ("Jau puiku, tik dar šiek tiek...")
Emilis Vėlyvis, Jonas Banys, Aidas Puklevičius ("Zero II")

Best operator 
Feliksas Abrukauskas ("Jau puiku, tik dar šiek tiek...", "Gerumo sparnai")
Vilius Mačiulskis ("Lernavan")
Linas Dabriška ("Laisvas kritimas")

Best compositor 
Kipras Mašanauskas ("Atsisveikinimas")
Happyendless ("Zero II")
Rokas Eltermanas ("Laisvas kritimas")

Best professional job 
 Jonas Maksvytis
"Skalvija"
Asta Liukaitytė

Best student film 
Sinchronizacija (by Rimas Sakalauskas)
Bomba (by Saulius Leonavičius)
Kryžiažodis (by Ieva Veiverytė)

Special award 
"Auksinė gervė" (golden crane) of merits for Lithuanian cinema:
Arūnas Žebriūnas (director)

References

External links 
Lithuanian Cinema Academy

Sidabrinė gervė
2010 in Lithuania
2010 film awards